BC Nevėžis, commonly known as Nevėžis Kėdainiai, also known as Nevėžis-OPTIBET due to sponsorship reasons, is a professional basketball club based in Kėdainiai, Lithuania. The club currently competes in the Lithuanian Basketball League.

History
BC Nevėžis was founded in 1992 by Stasys Mickevičius. In 1993 BC Nevėžis was renamed to KK Notra because of the club supporters UAB Notra. In 1999 because of the supporters changes, BC Notra was renamed to BC Nevėžis again until now. Club name came from the Nevėžis River, flowing through Kėdainiai city. Nevėžis first played in the second division LKAL (now - National Basketball League (Lithuania)), winning the title in 2002 and qualifying to the Lithuanian Basketball League. Nevėžis became a constant playoff contender, with the highest achievements being reaching the semifinals of the LKL in 2006, even taking future champion BC Lietuvos rytas to the limit, losing the series 1:2. They also reached the Baltic Basketball League semifinals in 2006, and won the BBL Challenge Cup in 2008. Nevėžis also won 3rd place in the LKF Cup in 2007 and 2012.

In 2017, after defeating the AEK Larnaca during the last qualification stage, Nevėžis qualified to the 2017–18 FIBA Europe Cup season, their first-ever European competition.

Players

Current roster

Depth chart

Squad changes for/during 2022–23 season

In

|}

Out

|}

Logos

Season by season

Detailed information of former rosters and results.

Head coaches
  Marius Kiltinavičius: 2019–2020
  David Gale: 2020–2021
  Marius Kiltinavičius: 2021
  Gediminas Petrauskas: 2021–present

Notable players

 Lithuania:
  Jonas Mačiulis 2004–2005
  Simonas Serapinas 2003
  Darius Šilinskis 2004–2005, 2008–2010, 2012–2014
  Benas Veikalas 2007–2009
  Vilmantas Dilys 2013–2014
  Vidas Ginevičius 2011–2012, 2013–2014
 Greece
  Georgios Kalaitzakis 2019–2020
  Panagiotis Kalaitzakis 2019–2021
 Germany
  Ariel Hukporti 2020–2021
 Italy
  Abramo Canka 2020–2021
 Ukraine
  Oleksandr Kolchenko 2015–2016
 United States
  Brad Davison 2022–present

References

External links

  
 BC Nevėžis Fan page (Lithuanian)
 BC Nevėžis LKL.lt (Lithuanian)
 BC Nevėžis BBL.net (English)

 
Sport in Kėdainiai
Basketball teams established in 1992
Nevezis
1992 establishments in Lithuania